Swami Ramdev - Ek Sangharsh is an Indian biopic television series based on the life on Swami Ramdev. It is produced by Ajay Devgn FFilm Productions and Watergate Productions. It premiered on 12 February 2018 on Discovery Jeet. The show launched on Netflix with the title Swami Baba Ramdev: The Untold Story.

Cast
 Kranti Prakash Jha as Swami Ramdev
 Naman Jain as Young Swami Ramdev
 Deepal Joshi as Acharya Balkrishna
 Sadhil Kapoor as Young Balkrishna
 Tej Sapru as Gowardhan Maharaj
 Shriswara as Gulabo Devi
 Mahesh Balraj as Ram Niwas Yadav
 Darshan Gurjar as Devdutt
 Dadhi Pandey as Principal Bharadwaj
 Ankit Verma as Collector
 Jitendra Bohara as Acharya Mohan
 Trishna Singh as Swami Ramdev's Aunt

References 

Indian television articles by quality
2018 Indian television series debuts
Discovery Jeet original programming
Ajay Devgn
Indian drama television series
Television shows set in Haryana
Television shows set in Uttarakhand